Nehtaur is a city, near Bijnor city in Bijnor district in the northern Indian state of Uttar Pradesh. Nehtaur is an ancient and well known town because of its culture and educational backgrounds. Nehtaur Town was established by the Taga Minister family of Ajmer state when they came from Ranthambhor, Rajasthan after it was captured by Qutubuddin Aibak and the place was called Nai+thour = NEHTAUR (New Abode). This is how Nehtaur derived its name [Ref. Book-History of Islam in India].

During the British period also, Tyagi/Taga (called Chaudhary, Hindu & Muslim) & Syed were the main Jageerdar (estate) and Nehtaur became upper class community hub. Syed and Tyagi dominated town and both community hold the entire economy. During that time, Nehtaur was very famous town in the state because of its higher educational status and its many people were graduates. Its Sanskrit pathshalas and Arabic madrasas were famous in the region [1]

When India was under the British Administration that time only Nehtaur was single town which had its own administration called "Bara Topi Sarkar" 12 prominent and educated personalities belong from Syed community were run their own Government in Nehtour. Nehtaur had independent administration during the British period.

When Sir Syed Ahmad Khan visited Nehtaur and asked people for their support and donation for Aligarh College. He was impressed by the town and its citizens due to their positive response and called the town as "Danishmand" or wise.

Geography
It is situated at an altitude of 728 meters above sea level. Operated by Uttar Pradesh State Road Transport Corporation (UPSRTC), Nehtaur Bus Station is a minor bus terminal and connects the town to state highway. Regular buses ply from Nehtaur to Dhampur, Bijnor, Nagina, Nurpur, Haldaur and Afzalpur. Also, the station provides short-distance services to nearby places. The nearest railway station is Dhampur and Haldaur Railway Station  and the nearest airport is Indira Gandhi International Airport, New Delhi.

Demographics
As of 2001 India census, Nehtaur had a population of 44,301. Males constitute 52% of the population and females 48%. Nehtaur has an average literacy rate of 80%, higher than the national average of 59.5%: male literacy is 74%, and female literacy is 65%. In Nehtaur, 10% of the population is under 6 years of age.

Economics
Nehtaur is famous for Mango & Cotton industries as well as transport Truck Business.  its rich culture and harmony. It also has the highest selling Bharat Petroleum Corporation Limited petrol pump of the area.

References

Cities and towns in Bijnor district